Dan-Ola Eriksson (born 12 September 1963) is a Swedish curler.

He participated in the demonstration curling events at the 1988 Winter Olympics and 1992 Winter Olympics, where the Swedish team finished in fifth place both times.

Teams

References

External links

Living people
1963 births
People from Strömsund Municipality
Swedish male curlers
Curlers at the 1988 Winter Olympics
Curlers at the 1992 Winter Olympics
Olympic curlers of Sweden